Pingasa cinerea, the tan-spotted grey, is a moth of the family Geometridae. The species was first described by William Warren in 1894. It is found in the Australian states of New South Wales, Queensland, Tasmania and Victoria.

The wingspan is about 30 mm. Adults are grey brown with a wavy pattern of darker markings. They have a rare resting posture, with the forewings dislocated to point forward.

The larvae are pale brown and covered in spiky warts.

References

Moths described in 1894
Pseudoterpnini